= United States Department of State panic button software =

The panic button software is an application being developed by the United States Department of State as part of its "Internet freedom programming." The program, which is designed for mobile devices, will allow users to wipe the contacts in address books, history, and text messages, and also sends out an alert to all the contacts. The application, which was first reported by Reuters, will be used by qualified social activists. The application has received criticism that it may be used against American law enforcement. The United States has trained over 5,000 activists with plans to control the application's distribution.
